is a Prefectural Natural Park in Iwate Prefecture, Japan. Established in 1962, the park spans the municipalities of Ninohe, Ichinohe and Kunohe.

See also
 National Parks of Japan

References

External links
  Map of Oritsume Basenkyō Prefectural Natural Park (Oritsume area)
  Map of Oritsume Basenkyō Prefectural Natural Park (Basenkyō area)

Parks and gardens in Iwate Prefecture
Protected areas established in 1962
1962 establishments in Japan